Dunholme is a village and civil parish in the West Lindsey district of Lincolnshire, England. The earliest written evidence concerning Dunholme is found in the 1086 Domesday Book.

The village stands almost exactly in the centre of its parish, on the banks of the Welton Beck, which follows into the village from Welton in the North.

There are multiple theories on the origins of the village's name. One presented in The Place and River Names of the West Riding of Lindsey is that the name of the village is derived from "Dunham" from 'dun' meaning hill, and 'ham' meaning river bend. An alternative origin by Ekwall suggests the name came from "Donna's ham", meaning the 'ham' or enclosure of Dunna, possible an Anglo-Saxon.

Within the village, Dunholme has a post office, a village shop, St Chad's CE Primary School on Ryland Road.

William Farr C of E Comprehensive School is partially located within the parish boundary and is accessible from Honeyholes Lane in the village of Dunholme, however the main entrance is located on Lincoln Road in Welton.

The parish church is dedicated to Saint Chad, and is a Grade I listed building, built in Early English style. It contains a kneeling effigy to Robert Grantham (died 1616), which was restored in 1856 and 1892. The church forms part of the benefice of Welton, Dunholme and Scothern. The rood screen was carved by the Congolese sculptor Mahomet Thomas Phillips.

RAF Dunholme Lodge airfield was used by RAF Bomber Command during the Second World War. It closed in 1964 and little remains. Some of the land was purchased by Rev William Farr in 1946 for the site of William Farr School.

Every summer, the village holds a village fête. The fête is held in the centre of the village near the church and involves a duck race alongside many other activities.

The village has a camera club.

Local history
Dunholme has had a significant impact on Lincolnshire history. Terence Leach, who was headmaster of the village primary school, was a passionate advocate of Lincolnshire history and wrote a number of books on the areas's history. He is best known as the author of a series of books on Lincolnshire country houses. He also helped create the annual Brackenbury Lectures in aid of the Raithby Methodist Chapel. More recently Adrian Gray, the son of a former vicar of Dunholme, has published several books on Lincolnshire history.

References

External links

 Parish Council website
 Dunholme village website
 St Chad's primary school
 Welton, Dunholme & Scothern Benefice
 Community Centre

Villages in Lincolnshire
Civil parishes in Lincolnshire
West Lindsey District